The 2011 Primera B season was the 61st completed season of the Primera B de Chile.

Torneo Apertura

Deportes Antofagasta was tournament’s champion.

Torneo Clausura

Everton de Viña del Mar was tournament’s champion.

References

External links
 RSSSF 2011

Primera B de Chile seasons
Primera B